This article is a list of American football officials who have experience working National Football League (NFL) games.

Note: Years listed refer to season the official began or ended career in the NFL. At the start of the 1998 season, the NFL switched position titles of Back Judge and Field Judge.  Prior to 1998, the Field Judge was the deep official in the center of the field, and the Back Judge was deep on the sideline.

See also
Art McNally Award
Super Bowl officials
American Football League officials

References 

 Richmond Times Dispatch    
Valley Independent

Officials
National Football